Yuhbae is a genus of butterflies in the family Lycaenidae.

Theclini
Lycaenidae genera